"I'm Awesome" is a song written and recorded by American hip hop artist Spose. The single  debuted at number 54 on the Billboard Hot 100 on March 25, 2010, and reached #37 in its fourth week on the chart.  The single has since gone gold for sales exceeding 500,000 units.

Originally self-released in January 2010, the song received significant airplay on radio stations in Spose's home state of Maine, and in February and March 2010 received airplay across the country. It was released at the iTunes Store on March 9, 2010.  A music video was filmed in Maine shortly thereafter, and was released on April 14, 2010. In October 2010, an official remix for the song was recorded by Spose which features Kansas City–based rapper Mac Lethal as the official guest. In January 2012, "I'm Awesome" was used as a theme song for the show "Mr. D", a sitcom which aired on CBC, starring Gerry Dee.

Chart performance

Certifications

References

External links 
 Live performance of I'm Awesome on WCSH-6 (Maine NBC affiliate)
Official Video (uncensored)

2010 singles
Spose songs
2009 songs
Universal Republic Records singles